XHPHBP-FM is a radio station on 91.7 FM in Huauchinango, Puebla, Mexico. It is owned by Grupo Ultra and carries its Ultra pop format.

History
XHPHBP was awarded in the IFT-4 radio auction of 2017 and came to air with a formal inauguration on April 21, 2018.

References

Radio stations in Puebla
Radio stations established in 2018
2018 establishments in Mexico